Thyagaraja Mangalam is a rāgam in Carnatic music(musical scale of South Indian classical music) created by music composer .Named after Carnatic vocalist and musicologist T. M. Thyagarajan. It is the Janya raga of 23rd Melakarta rāgam Gowri Manohari in the 72 melakarta rāgam system of Carnatic music.

The Western equivalent is the jazz minor scale but the second and sixth note is omitted in ascending.

There is no equivalent rāgam in Hindustani music.

Structure and Lakshana 

Thyagaraja Mangalam is an asymmetric rāgam that does not contain rishabham or dhaivatam in the ascending scale. It is an audava-sampurna rāgam (or owdava rāgam, meaning pentatonic ascending scale). Its  structure (ascending and descending scale) is as follows.

 : 
 : 

The notes used in this scale are shadjam, sadharana gandharam, shuddha madhyamam, panchamam and kakali nishadham in ascending scale and chatushruti rishabham and chatushruti daivatam added in descending scale. It is a audava - sampurna rāgam

Compositions 
The composition in this rāgam

Dhyana Moolam - Viruttam

Notes

References 

Janya ragas